Cooper Icefalls are the main icefalls of the Nimrod Glacier, in the vicinity of Kon-Tiki Nunatak. They were named by the southern party of the New Zealand Geological Survey Antarctic Expedition (1960–61) for Christopher Neville Cooper, a member of the expedition, and also a member of the New Zealand Alpine Club Antarctic Expedition, 1959–60.

References
 

Icefalls of Oates Land